Michael Epps (born 12 March 1992) is a British/New Zealand racing driver who competed in the British Touring Car Championship in 2016 and 2017 for Team Hard.  Due to budget issues, Michael was unable to continue in the series and raced the supporting Clio Cup in 2018 and Ginetta G55 in 2019.

Racing career
Epps began his career in karting in 2007, he raced in karting up until 2011, where he switched to the 750MC Formula Vee Championship. He went on to finish 2nd in the championship standings that season. He switched to the Formula Renault BARC championship in 2012, he finished 13th in the championship that year. He also raced in the Formula Renault BARC Winter Series that year, finishing 10th in the standings. For 2013 he switched to the U.S. F2000 National Championship, finishing the season 13th in the championship standings. He started the 2014 season in the U.S. F2000 Winterfest, finishing 2nd in the championship standings with 2 wins, 4 podiums and 2 pole positions. He also made a one-off return to Formula Renault in the rebranded Protyre Formula Renault Championship. He switched to Volkswagen Racing Cup for 2015, finishing 8th in the championship standings with four wins. In March 2016, it was announced that Epps would make his British Touring Car Championship debut with RCIB Insurance Racing driving a Toyota Avensis.

Racing record

Complete British Touring Car Championship results
(key) (Races in bold indicate pole position – 1 point awarded just in first race; races in italics indicate fastest lap – 1 point awarded all races; * signifies that driver led race for at least one lap – 1 point given all races)

Complete Britcar results
(key) (Races in bold indicate pole position in class – 1 point awarded just in first race; races in italics indicate fastest lap in class – 1 point awarded all races;-

† Epps was ineligible for points as he was an invitation entry.

References

External links
 
 

1992 births
Living people
British Touring Car Championship drivers
English racing drivers
British racing drivers
Britcar drivers
Ginetta GT4 Supercup drivers
Renault UK Clio Cup drivers
Formula Renault BARC drivers
Belardi Auto Racing drivers
U.S. F2000 National Championship drivers
GT4 European Series drivers